Jeffersonton is an unincorporated community in Culpeper County, Virginia, United States.

History
Jeffersonton was platted in 1798 and was named for Thomas Jefferson.

Notable residents
 William Meade Fishback –  17th Governor of Arkansas and U.S. Senator-Elect for Arkansas
 Douglas W. Owsley

References

Unincorporated communities in Culpeper County, Virginia
Unincorporated communities in Virginia
Populated places established in 1798
1798 establishments in Virginia